"Sweet Music Man" is a song written and recorded by American musician Kenny Rogers. It appears on his 1977 album Daytime Friends, from which it was released as the final single.

History
In 1977, the song reached number 9 on the country music charts published by Billboard, and number 44 on the Billboard Hot 100. The song was a number one hit on the Canadian country and adult contemporary charts published by RPM, reaching its peak on both charts for the week of December 31, 1977. Rogers used the song as a b-side to two of his later singles: "Lady" in 1980 and "You Were a Good Friend" in 1983.

Later in 1977, Dolly Parton included the song on her Here You Come Again album (Parton and Alison Krauss performed the song together at the 2010 concert at Foxwoods Casino honoring Rogers' fifty years in entertainment); Reba McEntire covered the song in 2001 on her album Greatest Hits Volume III: I'm a Survivor. Her version was also released as a single, reaching number 36 on the country music charts. At the time, it was her lowest-peaking single since "(I Still Long to Hold You) Now and Then" in 1980.

Through the years the song has been covered by numerous other artists, including Tammy Wynette, Dottie West, Billie Jo Spears, Waylon Jennings, Anne Murray, Johnny Hallyday and Millie Jackson.

Critical reception

Kenny Rogers version
Kip Kirby, of Billboard magazine reviewed the song favorably, calling it a "first rate singing job from Rogers and pop-oriented production should ensure the chances of this song to register in both country and pop formats." She goes on to say that the song contains "excellent guitar work, cascading strings and Rogers' vocal ability to help the song build to a pleasing climax."

Chart performance

Kenny Rogers

Millie Jackson

Reba McEntire

References

1977 singles
1978 singles
2002 singles
Kenny Rogers songs
Millie Jackson songs
Reba McEntire songs
Songs written by Kenny Rogers
Song recordings produced by Larry Butler (producer)
United Artists Records singles
MCA Nashville Records singles
1977 songs
Songs about music